Francis Dyer (4 February 1867 – 1936) was a Scottish professional footballer who played in the Football League for Bolton Wanderers, Manchester City and West Bromwich Albion.

Aged 19/20 Dyer signed for  Renton. He played at Renton for one season and travelled South to England in 1888.

References

1867 births
1936 deaths
Scottish footballers
Association football midfielders
English Football League players
Renton F.C. players
Bolton Wanderers F.C. players
Vale of Leven F.C. players
Warwick County F.C. players
West Bromwich Albion F.C. players
Arsenal F.C. players
Manchester City F.C. players